Yoon Kwang-ung (born October 13, 1942 in Busan) is a retired Vice Admiral of the Republic of Korea Navy & former South Korean Minister of National Defense. He held the 39th to hold the post, which he entered in July 2004 after being appointed by president Roh Moo-hyun.  He graduated from Busan Commercial High School in 1961 and from the ROK Naval Academy in 1966. He served in various positions in the Navy from 1985 to 2000; thereafter, he worked for three years as an advisor to Hyundai Heavy Industries.

Yoon has been awarded various honors, including the US Legion of Merit and the Korean Order of National Security Merit.

See also
List of Koreans
List of South Korean politicians
Military of South Korea
Government of South Korea

References

External links

Official English-language profile
Rumsfeld and Rice on the Koreas

1942 births
Living people
People from Busan
Foreign recipients of the Legion of Merit
South Korean Roman Catholics
Order of National Security Merit members
Republic of Korea Navy admirals
National Defense ministers of South Korea
Korea Naval Academy alumni